Televisora de Oriente, or TVO, is a Venezuelan private television channel founded in 1992. The station are located in Puerto La Cruz and the signal can be seen in the Venezuelan states of Anzoátegui (channels 5 and 13), Monagas (channel 32), Nueva Esparta (channel 8), and Sucre (channel 8).  Some people in the Miranda and Guárico states can also pick up the signal of TVO.  It began broadcasting about twelve years ago.

Programming
You can see TVO's program chart at: http://www.tvo.com.ve/images/programacion.jpg.  

For those who do not know Spanish, "Horario" is the timing, "Lunes" is "Monday", "Martes" is "Tuesday", "Miercoles" is "Wednesday", "Jueves" is "Thursday", "Viernes" is "Friday", "Sabado" is "Saturday", and "Domingo" is "Sunday".

Trivia
TVO's addresses are:  Calle Honduras con Calle Freites, Edificio TVO, Puerto La Cruz, Edo. Anzoátegui, Venezuela and Av. Alirio Ugarte Pelayo, C.C. Monagas Plaza, Piso 1, Oficina PB-1 y PB-2, Maturín, Edo. Monagas, Venezuela.

External links
Official website 

Television networks in Venezuela
Television stations in Venezuela
Spanish-language television stations
Television channels and stations established in 1992